Naurangabad is a village in the Bhiwani district of the Indian state of Haryana. , the village had 553 households with a total population of 3,016 of which 1,633 were male and 1,383 female. A coin hoard found here suggested that it was a minting centre of the Yaudheya kingdom.

References

Villages in Bhiwani district